EJ DiMera is a fictional character from Days of Our Lives, an American soap opera on the NBC network. Created by head writer James E. Reilly and introduced under executive producers, Ken Corday and Tom Langan, EJ is the son of crime boss Stefano DiMera (Joseph Mascolo) and the eccentric Susan Banks (Eileen Davidson). Originally portrayed by child actors: Avalon, Dillon and Vincent Ragone from February 1997 to April 1998, the character was rapidly aged in 2006 when James Scott was cast in the role; he departed the role in October 2014. In 2018, the role was briefly portrayed by Trey Baxter. In June 2021, Australian actor Dan Feuerriegel assumed the role.

Upon the character's 2006 re-introduction, EJ is immediately taken with Sami Brady (Alison Sweeney), with the pairing becoming one of the most popular and controversial couples in recent history, with the controversy stemming from EJ raping Sami in exchange for his help in saving the life of her longtime love, Lucas Horton. This rape also produces their son, Johnny. The couple's first marriage is for convenience allowing EJ to stay in the country when he begins having problems with immigration. EJ also has a chaotic relationship with Sami's nemesis, Nicole Walker. EJ and Sami's relationship is also rivaled by Sami's relationship with Rafe Hernandez. EJ reunites with Sami, but presumably dies after being shot by his disloyal bodyguard hired by rival Clyde Weston. However, Kristen reveals in 2017 that EJ is alive, and Susan and Sami are reunited with him the following year. EJ then returns to Salem in June 2021.

Scott's performance in the role garnered him two consecutive Daytime Emmy Award nominations for Outstanding Lead Actor in a Drama Series in 2010 and 2011.

Creation

Background
According to former Days writer, Kola Boof, she also helped to create the role of EJ Wells and was actually the person who decided to cast Scott in the role. Boof, titled her initial character bible for EJ Wells as "The Devil Finds Work." Boof revealed to Nelson Branco of TV Guide that EJ initially comes to town to avenge his mother, Susan (Eileen Davidson), who by that time had been in a mental institution. Eileen Davidson was set to reprise the role for a few episodes slated to air in the fall. However, the planned story was abandoned when Boof was fired from the writing team. The character was always meant to be a race car driver, but following Boof's firing, his career as a racer was also forgotten about, and he was instead written as a lawyer.

Majority of EJ's childhood is spent with a nanny whom he refers to as his governess, whom he compares to Mary Poppins. EJ begins attending boarding schools at a very young age. EJ is a fan of Jazz music. EJ attends Eton College along with Duke of Cambridge, Prince William (revising his birth year to 1982) and even serviced his car at one point. EJ later attends Oxford University. During this time, EJ is in a long term romance with another woman, and they graduate Oxford together. However, she wants to pursue a career while EJ is given the chance to compete in the European racing circuit. He asks her to come with him, but she refuses and they go their separate ways. EJ then dedicates himself to racing, and becomes known worldwide for his skill. After college, EJ works in Cairo doing import and export work and also lives in India for a while. EJ also has experience as a bartender. He spends a lot of time in Monte Carlo as a race car driver.

Casting

In May 2006, it was announced that Scott, previously known for his controversial role as Ethan Cambias on All My Children was slated to join the cast of Days in the role of E.J. The character's surname remained secret to keep his connections to other characters on canvas a secret. Scott filmed his first scenes on May 3, and made his debut on May 30, 2006. Kola Boof revealed that Justin Hartley, formerly of Passions was also considered for the role. After Scott's character was killed off of All My Children, Scott stayed in New York City until the end of pilot season when he was contacted by the casting department from Days. They told Scott that he would definitely fit in the role of EJ. However, at the time, Scott was still under contract with ABC. Scott asked to be released from his contract, and the network agreed. In February 2009, Scott revealed that he re-signed with the series for another two years. In December 2010, Scott revealed that he was considering branching out into other mediums and hinted at the possibility of retiring from acting. In late September 2011, Soap Opera Digest revealed that James would depart the series when his contract expired. However, negotiations continued shortly after the news broke about Scott's potential departure. James issued the following statement: "It has always been my wish to continue working with Days of our Lives, and in light of recent reassurances given, I am optimistic of my future here at Days." Deanna Barnert speculated that the recent reboot of the series, which included bring back several popular veteran characters was in preparation of Scott's potential departure. On October 5, it was confirmed that Scott had re-signed with the series for another year with his contract set to expire in April 2013. Scott later extended his stay for another year. On May 2, 2014, Soap Opera Digest confirmed that Scott had wrapped filming and would exit the series screen sometime in the fall. In a May 2020 interview with Soap Opera Digest, Paul Telfer revealed he had previously been hired as a one-week stand-by, due to an undisclosed health issue by James. Telfer later joined the cast as Xander Kiriakis in 2015.

On March 31, 2021, Daytime Confidential reported Australian actor Dan Feuerriegel had been cast in the role. Two months later, Deadline Hollywood announced Feuerriegel's casting; he made his first episodic appearance during the final moments of the June 9, 2021, episode.

Characterization
Prior to his debut, Scott revealed that there were some similarities between his new character, and his former alter ego Ethan Cambias. The only thing Scott was told about his character was that he was a race-car driver. Though it does not completely define the character, it does affect who EJ is. EJ is not easily affected by everyday life because he is used to operating in high pressure situations, like racing. Whenever his life is in danger and he is forced to make a decision, it puts EJ at "ease". Scott was allowed to use his natural British accent in his portrayal of EJ. In 2008, BuddyTV referred to the character as a "dashing" anti-hero, because he is a "good guy" and a "bad guy" all in one. EJ, like any other person, has a dark side to him. In 2011, Deanna Barnert described the character as "nefarious."

Storylines

1997–1998
Elvis Aaron Banks was born to Stefano DiMera and Susan Banks (Eileen Davidson) on February 21, 1997. At the time, Susan, a Kristen Blake (also Davdison) look alike, was paid to give birth to a baby that would then be adopted by Kristen, unbeknownst to John Black, Kristen's fiancée. Susan realizes that Kristen is deceptive and cruel, while John was loving and noble. As the real mother of the child that Kristen and John claimed as theirs, Susan planned to take Kristen's place at John's side and in his bed. Marlena Evans, however, managed to foil the plans of both Kristen and Susan; Marlena and John reunited, and Susan was content to then find love with Edmund Crumb. Salemites believed that EJ was then raised by Susan and Edmund, who move to the United Kingdom. Stefano, however, managed to snatch EJ from Susan, raising him at Maison Blanche in New Orleans and sending him to British boarding schools.

2006–2014

EJ Wells first appears as Sami Brady’s handsome new neighbor living across the hall. The growing chemistry between him and Samantha stopped abruptly as EJ was soon revealed to be the mysterious figure attacking Sami's family and his connection to Stefano was also discovered. In December 2006, EJ held Sami at gunpoint and forces her to help him through the police road blocks set up by Salem PD to keep him from leaving the country after he shot John Black. After Sami got him through the road blocks, EJ then told her to get out of the car. Sami refused and told him that since she helped him he must help her save Lucas Horton's life. EJ agreed to help her only if she has sex with him in exchange for saving Lucas; EJ then raped Sami.  Afterward, he helped Sami get a beam off of, but then left them to die in the snow with no way out. EJ brainwashed Steve Johnson and forced him to kidnap a comatose John Black, and transplanted one of his kidneys into a dying Stefano. When Sami learned she was pregnant, Celeste Perrault revealed that EJ was the child's father but warned him that Stefano wouldn't approve. His brother, Tony DiMera convinced him to kidnap Sami and harvest the stem cells from the unborn child to save Stefano's life. EJ changed his mind and helped Sami escape at the last minute. Sami later learned she was carrying twins and Stefano ordered them to marry so they could end the feud between the Brady and DiMera families once and for all. Sami welcomed her twins in October 2007.  It turned out that Lucas fathered the little girl, Allie and EJ fathered the little boy, Johnny. After John was killed in a hit and run accident, Sami married EJ in November 2007, blackmailed by Stefano and EJ and against her will, but he was shot at the altar by Lucas (it was later that we found that Will, Lucas' son was the one that actually shot EJ.) EJ promised to change and become good example for the twins while Lucas was arrested for EJ's shooting. Later, Sami's mother Marlena Evans gave him a chance to redeem himself by bringing down his father. EJ knew that a brainwashed John Black was in the basement of the DiMera mansion and decided to reunite him with his family in January 2008. To stay safe from Stefano, EJ and Sami moved into a safe house where they bonded over raising the twins. They planned to have the marriage annulled but the death of Sami's grandpa, Shawn forced them to put it off. When they finally got another chance, EJ put it off by pretending that his visa has expired, and Sami agreed to prolong the marriage until he can deal with immigration. EJ began representing Nicole Walker during her divorce from Victor Kiriakis. Meanwhile, EJ and Sami made love for the first time in May 2008 just in time for Lucas to be released from prison and catch them in bed. Sami discovered EJ's ploy to stay married to her by bribing the immigration agent, and their annulment was finalized soon after.

In July 2008, EJ and Nicole get trapped in an elevator together and ended up having sex. Nicole learned she was pregnant but hid it when she had a miscarriage. Nicole also learned that Sami was pregnant by EJ and planned to keep it from him. Nicole faked her pregnancy and took teenage Mia McCormick's child for her and EJ to raise. However, she later switched Mia's baby with Sami's baby. She and EJ name EJ's and Sami's daughter, Sydney Anne. When Sami returned home from the Witness Protection Program, she claimed to have adopted baby Grace. EJ and Nicole married in April 2009. Tony DIMera, EJ's brother, would die after getting into a fight with Philip Kiriakis. EJ blamed Philip for Tony's death and wanted revenge; this would lead to a war with Philip Kiriakis and his father Victor. A feud between DIMeras and Kiriakis started, but in the end they called a truce.

EJ was devastated after Grace died in June 2009 and Sami told him that he was the child's father. EJ became furious with Sami for keeping EJ from his child. EJ felt hurt and betrayed by Sami for lying to him. EJ was heartbroken and grieved over the loss of his daughter. For months EJ would be angry with Sami while being in pain over losing Grace and never knowing his own daughter. Despite being angry, EJ was still in love with Sami and hurt over the fact that she lied and kept from his daughter and didn't trust him and try pass Rafe Hernandez off as the father. However EJ later would start suspect Nicole was keeping something from him. EJ sent someone to spy on Nicole to get information. EJ learned from that Nicole had a miscarriage and he kicked her and Sydney out of the mansion. But what EJ didn't know was that Sydney was his real daughter, not Grace. EJ personally would change over the year: he would grow more and more angry, more ruthless less, more aggressive, more colder and more calculating as time went by. EJ saved Rafe Hernandez's life after one of Stefano's men tried to kill Rafe, but EJ put a stop to it. Rafe later revealed that Nicole switched the babies and Sydney was actually EJ and Sami's child. EJ and Sami reunited with Sydney; EJ and Sami would call a truce. EJ later realized that Stefano assisted Nicole in her schemes. EJ took all his anger and rage out on Stefano by choking him; EJ severed ties with Stefano again.

In December 2009, Nicole attempted to kidnap Sydney and skip town. This brought EJ and Sami closer to together as the two share a moment with one another over Sydney. EJ, Sami and Rafe worked together to try and bring Sydney back, but Sydney was stolen from Nicole by someone else. EJ and Sami united to try and find Sydney but EJ overheard Sami saying that she wished EJ wasn't in the picture, that Rafe was Sydney's father and that she and Rafe could raise Sydney together. After hearing this EJ was furious at Sami.

It was revealed that EJ had kidnapped Sydney and later faked her death as revenge on Sami for keeping the child a secret and to break up her and Rafe. His sister-in-law, Anna DiMera was his accomplice. EJ was seen as the "hero" when he suddenly brought Sydney back home and he and Sami became close again. EJ realized later that he still in love with Sami and felt guilty over what he had done. EJ and Sami became closer and later ended up sharing a passionate kiss. EJ confessed his love for Sami and gave her a kiss. Later the two would go on a date and EJ asked Sami to marry him. At first Sami hesitated but later said yes.

 In August 2010, as they prepared to marry, Rafe revealed EJ's schemes and Sami walked out on him. Sami shot a drunken EJ in the head and left him for dead. EJ woke up from a coma believing he and Sami got married but the truth is that she was now married to Rafe. Rafe's sister, Arianna found proof that Sami shot EJ but she was killed in an accident before she could get it to him. However EJ received Arianna's proof from Nicole.

EJ blackmailed Sami into giving him full custody of Johnny and Sydney. EJ asked Nicole to marry him, so he could get back at Sami by making Nicole the children's step-mother. Later when it was learned Johnny had eye cancer, EJ and Sami put their problems behind them. EJ made a deal with God to let Johnny keep his eyes and he would let Sami be part of Johnny's and Sydney's lives. Stefano also revealed to EJ and his sister, Lexie Carver that they have another brother, Chad Woods, the biological father of baby Grace.

EJ and Nicole marry in February 2011. While EJ made the deal with God to allow Sami be part of Johnny's and Sydney’s lives, he never said he would allow Rafe. EJ schemed to take Rafe out of the picture. Stefano came up with a plan to replace Rafe with someone else. Stefano hired convict Arnold Feniger and gave him plastic surgery to make him identical to Rafe. In the meantime, Nicole's sister, Taylor arrived in town and she and EJ were instantly attracted to each other. Shortly after the wedding, EJ and Taylor began having an affair. After Nicole and Taylor's mother, Fay had a heart attack, EJ comforted them and allowed Fay to stay at the mansion.  Nicole soon learned about the affair and Nicole blackmailed EJ with what he and his father did to Rafe. Later EJ turned the tables on Nicole. EJ asked Taylor to marry him and she said yes.  However the truth about the fake Rafe came out and Taylor dumps EJ because Arnold killed her mother by pushing her down the stairs when she confronted Arnold about the truth. Arnold decided to testify against EJ and Stefano but Arnold was killed by other inmates in prison and EJ and Stefano went free.

EJ decided to run for mayor, against his brother-in-law and Lexie's husband Abe Carver; feeling lonely he asked Nicole to serve as his campaign manager and he convinced her to hold off their divorce. EJ and Nicole became closer during the campaign and even ended up having sex. However Nicole decided to go through with the divorce, much to EJ's dismay. Later EJ revealed he framed John Black for corporate embezzlement and used this to his advantage during campaign season. When the Brady family gathered at the Pub before John's trial, Johnny went missing. EJ and Sami were devastated when a news report claimed that Johnny was dead and to cope with the pain, they ended up having sex. Later EJ and Sami found out that Johnny was not dead and was with Rafe. Nicole told EJ she wanted to give them another chance and EJ and Nicole reunited. EJ and Sami agreed to keep what happen between them a secret. Sami's son, Will discovered them and tried to blackmail EJ into helping him leave town. EJ turned the tables on Will and reveals that he knows it was Will, not Lucas, who shot him during his wedding to Sami in 2007. He then forced Will to work for him. However EJ gave Will a race car and agreed to pay Will to work for him. Will agreed and took enjoyment in his new job with EJ. Will stole Abe's campaign information and handed it over to EJ. EJ won the election. However, the evening was interrupted when Rafe revealed that he found out about Sami and EJ's one night stand. Nicole left EJ while Rafe broke up with Sami. EJ tried to win back Nicole, but Nicole wanted a reconciliation only if EJ left Salem with her and abandoned the children he has with Sami. EJ bought Sami an apartment while learning Nicole was pregnant but Rafe lied and said, he was the father of Nicole's baby. EJ didn't believe Rafe was the father, and wanted a DNA test to prove the father's identity. Daniel Jones switched the test results, however even after, EJ still didn't believe that Rafe was the father of his and Nicole's baby.

In early 2012, Nicole reveals to EJ that it was Stefano who attempted to cost him the election, EJ find out Stefano stole money that he stole from John. Later learns from Billie Reed that Stefano destroyed his case against John Black by help clear his name. Adding more, the family is devastated when Lexie reveals that she is dying from a brain tumor. It reveals that when Andre held Lexie in the tunnels was how she got the brain tumor. EJ blamed Stefano because Andre worked for him, however Stefano claims he had nothing to with it. But this only added to heat between EJ and Stefano. This all would lead to EJ holding Stefano up at gun point planning to kill him. However EJ couldn't do it, so he left however Stefano was shot in cold blood. EJ became the prime suspect in Stefano's murder and was frame by Ian McAllister. Meanwhile, Lexie die from the brain tumor, EJ is devastated and heart broken over half-sister's death. EJ and Sami grew closer and start reconnected, Sami helped EJ to prove his innocence. EJ and Sami had no choice but to go on the run to clear EJ's name however an explosion happened, Sami saved Ej from the Salem cops ready to shoot him, the a big explosion happened in Salem, Sami almost fell to her death but EJ is able to save her with some help from will. EJ and Sami go to a safe house that belong to Stefano, EJ and Sami get closer, they end up kissing, however EJ had to find Ian McAllister to confront him, but EJ walk right into a trap set. EJ was Held captive By Ian and Came face to face with Stefano. Ian reveal that Stefano and EJ are in fact, biological father and son.

Later EJ got free and took down Ian, afterward EJ told Stefano off and that he want nothing to do with him. EJ go back to the safe house only to find Sami with Rafe who arrested both EJ and Sami, however later EJ and Sami would get out of jail. In August 2012, EJ and Sami the two give in to their feelings by kissing, but EJ is discouraged when Sami reveals that she doesn't want to jump into things and want to focus on her work and kids. Sami decides to give EJ a chance, however Rafe came back into the picture and Sami's life as she begins interacting with him. Rafe tells Sami that EJ no good for her and kisses Sami what cause her to end things with EJ. EJ become angry and confront Rafe, EJ head butt Rafe and two ended up get into a fight, however John and Lucas break up it, EJ decide to get back at Rafe, not just to win Sami back but also to prove that EJ was the father of Nicole's baby. EJ find out from Chad, that Rafe's sister, Gabi was behind Melanie's kidnapping, EJ use this to blackmail Rafe an stay away from Sami, Rafe lets EJ be with Sami, but Sami learns the truth from Chad and get mad at EJ and reunites with Rafe. However EJ got proof, he was the father of Nicole's child but came to find out his son is dead. EJ is heart broken and grief over the death of his son. However EJ get Nicole to confession that Rafe wasn't the father and the baby was theirs child. EJ records Nicole's confessing and confront both Rafe and Sami, reveals to Sami that Rafe was lying about being the father of Nicole's baby by play records. Sami break up with Rafe. EJ decide not to go after Nicole, Daniel and Rafe, he is shocked by the return of his adopted step-sister, Kristen Blake DiMera. EJ wanted to win back Sami, Kristen reveals that she is working with Sami. Kristen quits her job and gives it to EJ so that he can work with Sami and be closer to her. Sami still loves Rafe but Sami still have feelings for EJ. EJ and Sami grow closer while work together, EJ become closer to Sami. EJ had a talk with Caroline Brady, Caroline tells EJ that Sami love both Rafe and EJ, say maybe EJ can change, after talking with Caroline, EJ decides to become a better man for Sami, EJ spending Christmas Day and New Year's Eve with her. EJ kisses Sami three time on New Year's Eve but Rafe kisses Sami. Kate tells EJ that he could lose, once more, to Rafe in the battle for Sami's heart. Sami was going tells EJ she was getting back together with Rafe, but EJ confession his love for Sami, by telling Sami, he love her and that EJ was in love with her, Sami was speechless but however she still was planning on telling EJ.

Sami plans the wedding of Gabi to Nick Fallon, which ends when Will reveals that he is the father of Gabi's unborn baby, not Nick. This cause a big fight between Rafe and Sami, this cause her to run into EJ's arms. EJ was there for Sami, during the whole time through Will custody battle with Nick and Gabi. However Rafe told EJ that Sami was going to choice Rafe over EJ, EJ was upset about this and went to Sami and confront her about this. Sami told EJ everything however Sami said she didn't want throw EJ away and she confessed her true love for him and admitted she wanted be with EJ. EJ took all it in at once and forgave her. EJ and Sami reunite and later Sami tells EJ she loves and trusts him. Nick blackmails Will into giving up the rights to his unborn daughter with the information that Will shot EJ in 2007.

 Sami asks for EJ's help in getting rid of Nick. Desperate, the two of them turn to Stefano for help in getting rid of the evidence against Will. EJ proposes to Sami in April 2013, and she accepts. Meanwhile, it's revealed that EJ still holds a grudge against Stefano for disowning him as his son, and is seeking revenge by taking DiMera Enterprises from his father. To this end, he enlists the help of Justin Kiriakis to take Stefano down.

Rafe is viciously attacked, and the police and Sami suspect EJ. However, Sami later realizes EJ wasn't responsible. Will ends up saving Nick and Gabi when they are kidnapped by the real attacker, Jensen. Will is shot trying to save Nick, while Gabi gives birth to Arianna Grace. EJ comes to the hospital to support Sami while Will is in surgery and she meets her granddaughter. While there, she also visits Rafe. During a visit, Sami spots a man with a knife at Rafe's bedside and shoots him. EJ later finds out that the man was a corrupt police officer on Stefano's payroll. Though Sami insists the officer was holding a knife, and EJ believes her, the police are not able to find the weapon, and Sami is arrested for the murder of a police officer.

During the trial for officer Bernardi, to get Samantha out of jail, Ej has to beg his father and gravels to release Samantha. Stefano was actually the one who set up Sami with Bernardi's murder, the officer was killed by an ex-mistress, Stefano framed Sami to control Ej. Just like Stefano his plan was to make EJ give back the business Justin and him took from his father. Also he had to resign everything back to his father and promise not to leave the mansion ever even with Samantha and the children. Ej and Sami are happy living at the Dimera mansion but they have to put up with Stefano living under the same roof with them and their children. They get engaged, however during the engagement party Bernardi's widow try to take revenge on Sami and Ej by shooting Ej, Chad Ej's brother try to protect Ej and get the bullet at his place, he is injured and has to leave Salem with Stefano to get nursed.

EJ then is also caught in another cover up, the rape of Sami's twin brother Eric by his adopted sister Kristen. He discovers on Kristen's wedding day, that she drugged and raped Eric, at first he is horrified but then he let Kristen convince him to cover it, in the name of the Dimera family's loyalty. After Kristen is discovered at her wedding, she runs away. However thanks to a phone text from Kristen to Ej, Sami finds out Ej covered up for Kristen, Ej pretends to Samantha's face he knows nothing about the rape part, that Kristen said it was consensual, because he felt torn between his loyalty to his family and his love for Sami. He's getting tired of Sami's antics and the fact that she's doesn't appreciate him more by putting her family above him. He told her that he doesn't care about her brother but only her. During this time, Samantha's trust for Ej is shattered because of his behaviour concerning his cover up for his half-sister Kristen's crimes, as a result she refuses to make any plans of marriage or for a future with EJ, despite stating her love for him. He is also banned from Samantha's bedroom. EJ become very frustrating when Sami want put their relationship on hold.

EJ help cover the murder that Gabi, Sami and Kate did to Nick. EJ hired a special team to clean the scene and is always in the corner of Samantha, the love of his life. However, there were still problems between EJ and Sami, that lead to fights between the two, what cause more problems and Sami continue to reject any physical intimacy from Ej. EJ go to Smith Island and stop Abigail Deveraux from talking to Hope about Nick after Gabi told him, Abby was going to talk with Hope. EJ speeds off on his private boat, Abby and EJ talk. EJ try get Abby not tells Hope about Nick. Abby believe EJ is having an affair with Gabi, EJ tell that not true, Abby go on and said any woman want sleep with him. EJ realize that Abby attraction to him. Knowing this, EJ use it to stop Abby, just when she about go to Hope by kissing her. EJ stop the kiss and try to leave smith Island. However Abby stop EJ from leaving, she kiss him and then they begin having sex. After that Abigail begin to chase Ej at every opportunity. EJ try several times to reject Abby but she uses what she thinks happened about Nick's disappearance to get close to Ej and to have a sexual relationship with him. Several times EJ confront Abby and try to get her not to tells anyone, however Abby try blackmail EJ by saying, She was going tells Hope everything, if EJ didn't give her what she wanted, EJ and Abby kiss and almost had sex at the hospital where Abby is working and Ej is at the board as one of the backer, but stop when someone almost came in. After that, Abigail chase Ej at his gym locker room of his Dimera company and they have sex in the shower until they heard Sami and Ej stops the act immediately. 
Ej and Sami began to slowly reconcile and once again Ej try to persuade Abigail to stop pursuing him and to move on, finally once and for all he reject her.

Sami and EJ would really reconcile on Valentine's Day, EJ and Sami kiss. Later The two would rekindle their love and passionately make love. EJ move forward with his wedding to Sami. However One day, a picture of them kissing at the Horton cabin arrives at the DiMera mansion. EJ hides it from Sami and immediately tries to locate the photographer. After a small investigation, EJ finds out that the photographer was Nick Fallon's assistant, Percy Ruggles. This cause EJ to go after Nick, first confronted Percy, threatens him into giving him the pictures to destroys and sends him back to England. EJ warn Nick if he try to ruin his family and tell Sami about the affair, Nick would be sorry. EJ hires a hit man to kill Nick, Sami agree to go along with EJ's plan. When Nick was shot, this put EJ and Sami on the list of suspects. It was later revealed that their hit man wasn't the one who killed him. Sami and EJ move forward with their wedding and Sami asks Abigail to be her Maid of honor. While planning her wedding, Sami comes across the photo of Abigail and EJ. She becomes furious but pushes forward with the wedding, after the ceremony, Rafe Hernandez shows up and arrests EJ for tax evasion. While in jail, EJ signs his proxies to Sami, so she can go to a board meeting in place of him. Sami attends the board meeting with Kate Roberts (who got Stefano to sign over his proxies to her) and are voted in as DiMera Enterprise's new Co-CEOs. Sami presents this information to a furious EJ and reveals to him that she was the one who gave the police the evidence for his tax evasion arrest. When EJ asked why she is doing this, she revealed that she knows about his hook up with Abigail and is going to make him pay. EJ try to get through to Sami and beg for her forgiveness, over and over again. However Sami refused to forgive EJ, but EJ wouldn't give up on Sami. To get back the money Sami and Kate stole from Stefano, EJ also negotiates with Victor and take his drug business but he is faced with a competitor in newly arrived Clyde Weston, who seems friendly and offers a partnership but really wants to takeover EJ's territory. Kristen return to Salem after kidnapped Daniel, Kristen was lock up and ask EJ for his help, however EJ turn down Kristen and refused to help her. Later the affair between EJ and Abby would become public by Will, this would bring EJ and Sami together. Sami would ask for EJ's help however EJ walk out on Sami, but later EJ would agree to help, if Sami would go out with him to lunch, Sami agreed. An effort to win Sami back, EJ would help Sami what saw two becoming closer again. However Stefano return to Salem shake things up for Sami and Kate.

However EJ gave Rafe documents on Stefano that hinder his return to Salem to protect Sami and also to win her back.  EJ and Sami eventually reconcile, Sami forgives EJ and they reunite. EJ and Sami enjoy their happiness, however EJ's mother Susan Banks returns to Salem warn EJ his life was in danger. EJ's brother Chad to get revenge on Ej, informs Stefano that it was EJ who helped the Salem Police keep him out of Salem. Stefano angrily disowns EJ saying he's dead to him. A furious EJ confronts Chad for revealing to Stefano his betrayal warning Chad that he's unleashed a bitter and vindictive Stefano on EJ, Sami, and their children. Johnny tells EJ the kids at school are teasing him because he's a DiMera, EJ tells Johnny that as he gets older he'll hear many things about the DiMera family but its a name to be proud of. EJ has a confrontation with Clyde over Salem's drug territory and is betrayed, shot, and killed by his disloyal bodyguard, Miguel. Stefano has EJ's sister Kristen inject an unknown substance into EJ's body in the morgue for an unknown reason saying only that "time is of the essence".

EJ's death causes Sami and her kids to leave Salem and move to Los Angeles, California.

2015–2018
In 2015 there were signs that EJ is still alive; Sami got letter from EJ saying, that if he were dead then Stefano was the cause. The letter was over a year old and contained nothing about Clyde Weston. Sami states EJ wrote things only she and EJ knew, and the letter instructed Sami to get the codes which drained all of Stefano's money from his secret accounts.

When EJ's sister Kristen (Stacy Haiduk) returns to Salem in August 2018 for John and Marlena's wedding, she reveals that EJ is alive and offers to tell Sami where he is, provided she shoots John. In September 2018, Kristen reveals to Stefan DiMera (Tyler Christopher) details about EJ being alive. Sami agrees to transfer funds he needs to sustain losses suffered by DiMera Enterprises in return for the information about EJ's whereabouts. Stefan reveals to Sami that under Stefano's instructions, Kristen injected EJ with a drug that kept him alive, sneaking him out of the hospital and that Stefano had Sami believe EJ was dead, and that EJ's body was never cremated. While Sami grieved EJ's "death", Kristen delivered EJ to Stefano. Stefan tells Sami that EJ is recovering at a private facility. When Brady Black (Eric Martsolf) sneaks into the facility, he finds Xander Kiriakis working with Kristen on a secret project that is revealed to be EJ's recovery. There, it is revealed that EJ's recovery is not as easy as intended, with him losing his ability to speak.

Reception
Scott's performance earned him a Daytime Emmy nomination for Outstanding Lead Actor in a Drama Series in 2010 and 2011.

See also
EJ DiMera and Sami Brady
List of soap opera villains

References

External links
 "EJ Wells, the Next Generation" at NBC
 EJ Wells biography at NBC
 James Scott as EJ Wells at NBC
 EJ Wells at soapcentral.com

Days of Our Lives characters
Fictional lawyers
Fictional businesspeople
Fictional business executives
Television characters introduced in 1997
Fictional mayors
Male villains
Male characters in television
Fictional characters incorrectly presumed dead
DiMera family